Rodrigo Riquelme may refer to:

Rodrigo Riquelme (footballer, born 1984), Paraguayan-born Chilean footballer
Rodrigo Riquelme (footballer, born 2000), Spanish footballer